Tracy Dale Terrell (June 23, 1943December 2, 1991) was an American education theorist who, along with Stephen Krashen, wrote The Natural Approach. The natural approach is a comprehension-based language learning methodology which  emphasizes the idea of exposure and the lowering of affective or emotional barriers to learning.

Terrell was a professor at the University of California, San Diego.

Career
Tracy D. Terrell graduated from the University of Texas at Austin with a Ph.D. in linguistics and in a comparatively short career of twenty-two years became one of the most important American Hispanists and theoretical linguists.  He taught at the University of California, Irvine from 1970 until 1985 when he accepted a position in the linguistics department at the University of California, San Diego.  He retired in 1989, finally succumbing to AIDS in 1991.  He is credited along with Stephen Krashen with the development of the “Natural Approach” to second language learning, now a widely utilized method of teaching second languages. In addition, he is widely respected for his work in Hispanic linguistics.  Dr. Terrell was fluent in Spanish, French, German, Italian, Portuguese, and Dutch—for which he had a special affection.

Partial bibliography
The natural approach: Language acquisition in the classroom, Hayward, CA : Alemany Press, 1983.
Dos Mundos, Spanish language textbook, McGraw-Hill
Deux Mondes, French language textbook, McGraw-Hill
Kontakte, German language textbook, McGraw-Hill
Bravo, Spanish language textbook, Glencoe (McGraw-Hill)

Journal articles
Terrell, T. D. (1980). A Natural Approach to the Teaching of Verb Forms and Function in Spanish. Foreign Language Annals, 13(2), 129-136.
Krashen, S. D., Terrell, T. D., Ehrman, M. E., & Herzog, M. (1984). A Theoretical Basis for Teaching the Receptive Skills. Foreign Language Annals, 17(4), 261–275.
Terrell, T. D. (1977). A Natural Approach to Second Language Acquisition and Learning1. The Modern Language Journal, 61(7), 325–337.

References

1943 births
1991 deaths
American education writers
Bilingualism and second-language acquisition researchers
Linguists from the United States
University of California, Irvine faculty
University of California, San Diego faculty
University of Texas at Austin College of Liberal Arts alumni
20th-century linguists